Mohamed Miloud (born 1935) is a Moroccan weightlifter. He competed in the men's middleweight event at the 1960 Summer Olympics.

References

1935 births
Living people
Moroccan male weightlifters
Olympic weightlifters of Morocco
Weightlifters at the 1960 Summer Olympics
Sportspeople from Casablanca